The Attorney General of Malaysia ( also referred to as the AG) is the principal legal adviser of Malaysia. The Attorney General is also the highest ranking public prosecutor in the country and is also known as the Public Prosecutor, or simply PP. The powers with regard to prosecution is contained in Article 145(3) of the Federal Constitution. For instance, exercisable at his discretion, the Attorney General may institute, conduct or discontinue any proceedings for an offence, other than proceedings before a Syariah court, a native court or a court-martial. 

Unlike a number of other Commonwealth common law jurisdictions, the head of the prosecuting authority in Malaysia is simply known as the Public Prosecutor, or PP, instead of the Director of Public Prosecutions, or DPP. In Malaysia, a prosecuting officer is known as a Deputy Public Prosecutor, also known as DPP, and it should not be confused with the previous meaning. 

The AG is also the head of the Attorney General's Chambers. There are separate chambers for the state of Sabah and Sarawak which deals with civil law matters affecting the respective state government. Criminal prosecution duties in Sabah and Sarawak are handled by the Malaysian AG. The other states in Peninsular Malaysia do not have separate chambers. 

The AG has often been accused of being partial towards the executive or offering too much deference towards the executive.
The 8th AG, Tommy Thomas, is the first non-Malay and non-Muslim Attorney General to hold office since the formation of Malaysia in 1963. Pakatan Harapan leader Anwar Ibrahim clarified that his appointment will not adversely affect the status of Islam in the country. Thomas resigned on 28 February 2020.

Article 145
The A-G's overall powers, roles, and responsibilities are provided for in Article 145 of the Federal Constitution:

The Yang di-Pertuan Agong shall, on the advice of the Prime Minister, appoint a person who is qualified to be a judge of the Federal Court to be the Attorney General for the Federation.
It shall be the duty of the Attorney General to advise the Yang di-Pertuan Agong or the cabinet or any minister upon such legal matters, and to perform such other duties of a legal character, as may from time to time be referred or assigned to him by the Yang di-Pertuan Agong or the Cabinet, and to discharge the functions conferred on him by or under this Constitution or any other written law.
The Attorney General shall have power, exercisable at his discretion, to institute, conduct or discontinue any proceedings for an offence, other than proceedings before a Syariah court, a native court or a court-martial.
Federal law may confer on the Attorney General power to determine the courts in which or the venue at which any proceedings which he has power under Clause (3) to institute shall be instituted or to which such proceedings shall be transferred.
In the performance of his duties the Attorney General shall have the right of audience in, and shall take precedence over any other person appearing before, any court or tribunal in the Federation.
Subject to Clause (6), the Attorney General shall hold office during the pleasure of the Yang di-Pertuan Agong and may at any time resign his office and, unless he is a member of the Cabinet, shall receive such remuneration as the Yang di-Pertuan Agong may determine.
The person holding the office of Attorney General immediately prior to the coming into operation of this Article shall continue to hold the office on terms and conditions not less favourable than those applicable to him immediately before such coming into operation and shall not be removed from office except on the like grounds and in the like manner as a judge of the Federal Court.

List of attorneys general

References

External links
Attorney General's Chambers of Malaysia 
Malaysian Judiciary
Malaysian Bar Council

 
Politics of Malaysia
Prosecution
Law of Malaysia